Mount Fryatt is Alberta's 26th highest peak. In 1920, it was named after Captain Charles Fryatt, a British merchant seaman who was executed by the Germans during World War I. It lies within peaks that are between the Athabasca and Whirlpool Rivers in Jasper National Park.


Geology

Mount Fryatt is composed of sedimentary rock laid down from the Precambrian to Jurassic periods. Formed in shallow seas, this sedimentary rock was pushed east and over the top of younger rock during the Laramide orogeny.

Climate

Based on the Köppen climate classification, Mount Fryatt is located in a subarctic climate with cold, snowy winters, and mild summers.

See also
Geology of Alberta
Brussels Peak

Gallery

References

Three-thousanders of Alberta
Mountains of Jasper National Park
Canadian Rockies